Kanał (Sewer) is a 1957 Polish film directed by Andrzej Wajda. It was the first film made about the 1944 Warsaw Uprising, telling the story of a company of Home Army resistance fighters escaping the Nazi onslaught through the city's sewers. The film is adapted from the story “They Loved Life” by Jerzy Stefan Stawinski. Kanał is the second film of Wajda's War Trilogy, preceded by A Generation and followed by Ashes and Diamonds.

The film was the winner of the Special Jury Award at the 1957 Cannes Film Festival.

Plot
It is 25 September 1944, during the last days of the Warsaw Uprising. Lieutenant Zadra leads a unit of 43 soldiers and civilians to a new position amidst the ruins of the now isolated southern Mokotów district of Warsaw.

The composer Michał manages to telephone his wife and child in another part of the city that is being overrun by the Germans. After a few words, she tells him that the Germans are clearing the building and that they are coming for her. Then the line goes dead. The next morning, 23-year-old Officer Cadet Korab apologizes after walking into a room to find the second in command, Lieutenant Mądry, and messenger girl Halinka in bed together (Halinka later reveals that Mądry is her first lover). A German attack is stopped, but Korab is wounded while disabling a Goliath tracked mine.

Surrounded by the enemy, Zadra is ordered to retreat through the sewers to the city centre. Now down to 27 fit to travel, including Korab, they slog through the filth.

Daisy, their guide, asks Zadra to let her help Korab, claiming that the others can find their way easily enough. Zadra consents. However, the pair fall further and further behind. When they reach the designated exit at Wilcza Street, Korab is too weak to climb the upward sloping tunnel, so they rest for a while. He notices some graffiti on the opposite wall, but cannot quite make it out. Daisy tells him it says "I love Janek", when the name is actually Jacek, Korab's first name. She decides that they should head in the direction of the river, which is only a short distance away and drives him on, not letting him stop. Finally, they see sunlight. By this time, Korab is half blind and at the end of his strength. He cannot see that the exit is closed off by metal bars. Daisy finally reveals her feelings for him, kissing him before telling him that he can rest for a while.

The main group follows Zadra for a while, but they become lost without Daisy. Finally, when Zadra tells Sergeant Kula to order them onward after a brief rest, they remain where they are. Kula lies and tells Zadra they are following in order to get him to keep going. Eventually, the only remaining soldier following Zadra and Kula is the mechanic Smukły.

Meanwhile, Mądry, Halinka and Michał are also lost. Eventually, Michał loses his mind and wanders away, playing an ocarina. Upon reaching a dead end, Mądry cries out that he has somebody to live for. When Halinka asks who, he tells her that he has a wife and child. She asks him to turn off his flashlight, and then shoots herself. Mądry finds an exit, but as soon as he has climbed out of the sewer he is disarmed by a German soldier and placed into the courtyard along with others who have come through the same manhole. Despondent, he kneels beside the bodies of others who have already been executed.

Zadra, Kula and Smukły miss the exit at Wilcza Street but find another - however it is booby trapped. Smukły disarms two German grenades, but is killed by the third and last. Zadra and Kula emerge from the sewer to find themselves in a deserted part of the ruined city. When Zadra tells Kula to bring up the rest of the men, Kula admits he lied and that they left them behind a long time ago. Enraged, Zadra shoots Kula and reluctantly heads back down into the sewer to search for his men.

Cast 
Teresa Iżewska as "Stokrotka" (Daisy)
Tadeusz Janczar as Jacek "Korab"
Wieńczysław Gliński as Lt. "Zadra"
Tadeusz Gwiazdowski as Sgt. "Kula"
Stanisław Mikulski as "Smukły"
Emil Karewicz as Lt. "Mądry"
Maciej Maciejewski as "Gustaw"
Vladek Sheybal as Michał, the composer (credited as Władysław Sheybal)
Teresa Berezowska as Halinka

Production

The story and script were written by Jerzy Stefan Stawiński who himself survived in the sewers as an officer of Armia Krajowa (the Polish underground resistance Home Army) during the Warsaw Uprising of August 1944.

The film was produced by Zespół Filmowy "Kadr" at Wytwornia Filmow Fabularnych (Feature Film Studio) in Łódź, Poland.

Kanal premiered in Warsaw on April 20, 1957.

Releases

Kanał earned Wajda the Special Jury Prize at the 1957 Cannes Film Festival. The film is largely free of the overt communist propaganda that characterised its predecessor, A Generation. It was released after the fall of the Stalinist regime of Bolesław Bierut, which followed the death of Joseph Stalin.

In April 2019, a restored version of the film was selected to be shown in the Cannes Classics section at the 2019 Cannes Film Festival.

Reception

While Wajda’s debut film A Generation (1955) received a measured critical response, Kanal provoked widespread controversy and debate among Poles as to its merits. Donota Niemitz and Stefan Steinberg remark that “the film was not received favorably in Poland. The futile death of the uprising’s heroes, covered in dirt and excrement, did not correspond to the idealized picture of the nation’s martyrs.” Critic Leon Buko in Dziennik polski complained “This whole Warsaw, this whole Rising wallows in filth, in the gutters of history…”
Aleksander Jackiewicz, of the Trybuna ludu wrote:

Biographer Boleslaw Michalek adds that Jackiewicz placed emphasis on the skeptical note in the film, its confrontation with the legend of the Warsaw Rising, and by and large this was how reviewers hailed Kanal as a landmark in Polish cinema.”

Theme

One of the principle thematic elements in Kanal concerns “Polish heroism” and the conceit that Poles have historically been prone to “acts of courage as futile as they are desperate.” Wajda’s initially considered referencing some celebrated - and semi-suicidal - cavalry charges in Polish history, including those during the Napoleonic era’s Battle of Samosierra, the Charge of Rokitna in WWI and the legend of the Charge at Krojanty, reputedly on German tanks in 1939. These were to be presented in a pre-credit sequence of but ultimately were abandoned.
Biographer Michalek Boleslaw observes:

Historic manifestations of “romanticism and heroism” were deemed anachronistic in post-war Poland and challenged by appeals to “reason” and “political common sense.” Despite these political exposures, Wajda’s romantic, sensual style” endows the characters in Kanal with “heroic dimensions.”

The descent into the sewers has been compared to Dante’s depiction of the souls damned in his Inferno, and acknowledged as such by Wajda. Biographer Boleslaw Michalek writes:

Political assessment

The historical subject that Wajda addressed in Kanal was one of the most politically and socially charged topics in post-war Poland. Like the other films in his war trilogy, Kanal was “an honest and valuable attempt to portray the complexity of Polish contemporary history and politics.” The film “masterfully” dramatizes the tragic fate of the men and women of a small unit of Polish Home Army resistance fighters. Biographer Bolestaw Michalek provides the context:

Michalek adds that “Wajda’s treatment of the Warsaw Rising and the retreat through the sewers had a definite and deliberate historical and social edge.”

By the mid-1950s, two fundamental perceptions had become established among Poles regarding the event. One was a popular romantic image of gallant young martyrs who died defending the homeland. The second was official skepticism as to the purity of the high-command’s motives in committing men and women patriots to a doomed endeavor.

Wajda, responding to these dual social outlooks, attempted to synthesis these in Kanal. Polish critic Krzysztof Teodor Toeplitz commented on the contrasting “heroic dimensions” of the characters in Kanal and the “latent skepticism” concerning the 1944 uprising:

See also 
Cinema of Poland
List of Polish language films

Footnotes

Sources 
Michalek, Boleslaw. 1973. The Cinema of Andrzej Wajda. The Tanvity Press. A. S. Barnes and Company. New York. 
Niemitz, Dorata and Steinberg, Stefan. 2016. Polish film and theatre director Andrzej Wajda dead at 90. World Socialist Web Site, 14 October 2016. https://www.wsws.org/en/articles/2016/10/14/wajd-o14.html Retrieved 4 July 2022.
World Socialist Web Site. 2019 75 years ago: Warsaw uprising violently suppressed by Nazi occupiers. World Socialist Web Site. 30 September 2019. https://www.wsws.org/en/articles/2019/09/30/twih-s30.html Retrieved 8 July 2022.

External links

 
 
Kanał an essay by John Simon at the Criterion Collection
Kanał on filmpolski.pl database
Andrzej Wajda on Kanał

1957 films
1950s war drama films
Polish war drama films
1950s Polish-language films
1950s German-language films
Polish black-and-white films
Films about Polish resistance during World War II
Films set in Warsaw
Warsaw Uprising
Films directed by Andrzej Wajda
1957 drama films
Polish World War II films